Peter Lak (born April 20, 1973) is a retired American soccer defender who played professionally in the USISL A-League and Major League Soccer.

Youth
Lak grew up in Huntington Beach, California, graduating from Ocean View High School in 1991. He attended Cal Poly Pomona where he played on the men’s soccer team in 1991 and 1992.  He transferred to Cal State Fullerton after his sophomore year and played on the Titan’s soccer team in 1993 and 1994.

Professional
In 1995, Lak played for the Los Angeles Salsa U-23 in the USISL Pro League.  On July 25, 1996, midway through the 1996 A-League season, he joined the Colorado Foxes of the A-League.  In 1997, he signed with the Orange County Zodiac which served as the farm team for the Los Angeles Galaxy.  On July 3, 1997, the Galaxy called Lak up from the Zodiac.  He remained with the Galaxy, playing two games, before being waived on November 14, 1997.  In 1998, Lak returned to Orange County and played for them through the 2000 season.

References

External links
 

1973 births
Living people
American soccer players
Cal State Fullerton Titans men's soccer players
Colorado Foxes players
LA Galaxy players
Los Angeles Salsa U-23 players
Major League Soccer players
Orange County Blue Star players
A-League (1995–2004) players
Cal Poly Pomona Broncos
Place of birth missing (living people)
Sportspeople from Huntington Beach, California
Association football defenders